Antoinette Pirie ( Patey; 4 October 1905 – 11 October 1991) was a British biochemist, ophthalmologist, and educator.

Biography
Antoinette Patey was born in Bond Street, London. Her father was a botanist and pharmacist. She was educated at Wycombe Abbey School, and then achieved a first-class honours in natural sciences (biochemistry) from Newnham College, Cambridge in 1932. She completed her PhD at the biochemical laboratory in Cambridge under the professorship of Sir Frederick Gowland Hopkins. She married fellow biochemist Norman Pirie in 1931. They had a son and a daughter.

Career
In 1939, Pirie joined a team at the Imperial Cancer Research Fund's Mill Hill laboratories, led by Ida Mann. The team investigated the effect of mustard gas on the cornea. Pirie was dedicated to the study of the eye for the rest of her life.

In 1942, she accompanied Ida Mann to Oxford as her assistant, and in 1947 she succeeded her, as Margaret Ogilvie reader in ophthalmology, at Somerville College, Oxford, and head of the Nuffield Laboratory of Ophthalmology.  One of her main concerns was deficiencies of vitamin A causing xerophthalmia and leading to blindness in the Third World.

Pirie established the Xerophthalmia Bulletin in 1972 and was also the editor and secretary. The bulletin comprised extracts from current scientific journals and original articles and comments. She relinquished the editorship in 1985.

Like her husband, she was an atheist and a passionate supporter of the Campaign for Nuclear Disarmament (CND).  She became an expert on the radioactive hazards of nuclear explosions. Her husband was chairman of the CND scientific committee for several years.  In 1957, in collaboration with nine working scientists – physicists, geneticists, physicians, and biologists, she edited Fallout to publicise the dangers which at that time the government was tending to minimize or conceal. Her scrupulous accuracy ensured that no criticism could be levelled at the book.

She died in Oxford, survived by her husband and two children.

References 

1905 births
1991 deaths
British atheists
British biochemists
British ophthalmologists
Women ophthalmologists
Cancer researchers
Alumni of Newnham College, Cambridge
Fellows of Somerville College, Oxford
Campaign for Nuclear Disarmament activists
Academics of the University of Oxford
20th-century British medical doctors
20th-century British women scientists